Dance Club Songs was a chart published weekly between 1976 and 2020 by Billboard magazine. It used club disc jockeys set lists to determine the most popular songs being played in nightclubs across the United States.

History
The Dance Club Songs chart underwent several incarnations since its inception in 1974.  Originally a top-10 list of tracks that garnered the largest audience response in New York City discothèques, the chart began on October 26, 1974 under the title Disco Action.  The chart went on to feature playlists from various cities around the country from week to week. Billboard continued to run regional and city-specific charts throughout 1975 and 1976 until the issue dated August 28, 1976, when a 30-position National Disco Action Top 30 premiered.  The first number-one song on the chart for the issue dated August 28, 1976, was "You Should Be Dancing" by the Bee Gees, spending five weeks atop the chart and the group's only number-one song on the chart.  

The chart would continue to be published continuously for over 40 years, but with changes. The chart soon expanded to 40 positions, then in 1979 the chart expanded to 60 positions, then 80, and eventually reached 100 positions from September 1979 until 1981, when it was reduced back to 80.  During the first half of the 1980s, the chart maintained 80 slots until March 16, 1985, when the Disco charts were splintered and renamed. Two charts appeared: Hot Dance/Disco Club Play, which ranked club play (50 positions), and Hot Dance Music/Maxi-Singles Sales, which ranked 12-inch single (or maxi-single) sales (also 50 positions, later reduced to 10 and discontinued in 2013, since replaced by the Dance/Electronic Digital Songs).

On January 26, 2013, Billboard introduced the Hot Dance/Electronic Songs chart, which tracks the 50 most popular dance and electronic songs as determined by Billboard based on digital single sales, streaming, radio airplay across all formats, and club play, with Dance Club Songs serving as the club play component to the multi-metric chart.

On March 31, 2020, due to the COVID-19 pandemic, which caused the closures of clubs, Billboard temporarily suspended the chart.  The last number-one song, for the issue dated March 28, 2020, was "Love Hangover 2020" by Diana Ross. Even after the pandemic receded and club attendance increased again, Billboard never revived the chart nor ever published additional information about a possible revival, effectively ending the nearly 44-year run of the chart.

Statistics and Record World data
Although the disco chart began reporting popular songs in New York City nightclubs, Billboard soon expanded coverage to feature multiple charts each week which highlighted playlists in various cities such as San Francisco, San Diego, Boston, Los Angeles, Miami, Phoenix, Detroit and Houston (among others).  During this time, Billboard rival publication Record World was the first to compile a dance chart which incorporated club play on a national level.  Noted Billboard statistician Joel Whitburn has since "adopted" Record Worlds chart data from the weeks between March 29, 1975 and August 21, 1976 into Billboards club play history.  For the sake of continuity, Record Worlds national chart is incorporated into both Whitburn's Dance/Disco publication (via his Record Research company) as well as the 1975 and 1976 number-ones lists.

With the issue dated August 28, 1976, Billboard premiered its own national chart (National Disco Action Top 30) and their data is used from this date forward.

In January 2017, Billboard proclaimed Madonna as the most successful artist in the history of the chart, ranking her first in their list of the 100 top all-time dance artists. Madonna holds the record for the most number-one songs with 50. Katy Perry holds the record for having eighteen consecutive number-one songs. Perry's third studio album, Teenage Dream (2010), became the first album in the history of the chart to produce at least seven number-one songs by a lead artist It held this record until Rihanna's eighth studio album Anti produced eight chart toppers from 2016 to 2017. Rihanna is the only artist to have achieved five number-one songs in a calendar year.

Artist achievements

Top 10 artists of all-time (1976–2016)

Most number ones

Most consecutive number-ones

Most number-ones in a calendar year

Quickest collection of first 10 number-ones

Song achievements

Most weeks at number one

Shortest climbs to number one

Longest climbs to number one
19th week — "Wordy Rappinghood"/"Genius of Love" by Tom Tom Club
19th week — "Walking on a Dream" by Empire of the Sun
17th week — "Losing It" by Fisher
16th week — "The Look of Love" by ABC
16th week — "Most Precious Love" by Blaze presents U.D.A.U.F.L. featuring Barbara Tucker
16th week — "Where Have You Been" by Rihanna
16th week — "Right Now" by Rihanna featuring David Guetta
Sources:

Biggest jump to number one
 (27-1) Thriller (all cuts) by Michael Jackson

Number-one songs covered by different artists
 "The Boss" — Diana Ross (1979), The Braxtons (1997), Kristine W (2008), and again Diana Ross (2019).
"You Make Me Feel (Mighty Real)" — Sylvester (1978) and Byron Stingily (1998)
"Back to Life" — Soul II Soul (1989) and Hilary Roberts (2019).
"Keep on Jumpin'" — Musique (1978) and Todd Terry with Martha Wash & Jocelyn Brown (1996)

Album achievements

Most number-one songs from one album

Records and other achievements
Madonna holds the record for the most chart hits, the most top-twenty hits, the most top-ten hits and the most total weeks at number one (75 weeks).
Enrique Iglesias, Dave Audé, Pitbull, and David Guetta are tied with 14 number-ones on the chart, the most among male artists.
Rihanna became the first artist to earn 4 number-ones on the chart in a year (2007), a feat she repeated a record 3 additional times before becoming the first act to earn 5 number-ones in a year (2017) as well.
Madonna scored three number-ones in a single year seven times (1985, 2001, 2003, 2006, 2012, 2015, 2019), making her the first and most act to do so.
Kylie Minogue became the first act to have two songs in the top three on March 5, 2011. Her song "Better than Today" was number-one while "Higher", a song by Taio Cruz on which Minogue features, was number three. On July 28, 2016, Rihanna became the second act to achieve this when her songs "Kiss It Better" and "Needed Me" were number one and three concurrently, however it made her the first act to have two songs in the top three as the lead act on both. David Guetta was the third to earn this distinction during the chart week of November 24, 2018, when "(It Happens) Sometimes", under his alias Jack Back, was number two, while his "Don't Leave Me Alone" collaboration with Anne-Marie was number three.
Madonna was the first artist in the chart's history to have 2 studio albums with 5 number-one songs each topping the chart, respectively; from her eighth studio album Music and her ninth studio album American Life; Katy Perry has since surpassed this record, achieving 7 number-ones from her third studio album Teenage Dream, and 5 number-ones from her fourth, Prism
The first 12-inch single made commercially available to the public was "Ten Percent" by Double Exposure in 1976.
The first number one on Billboards Disco Action chart was "Never Can Say Goodbye" by Gloria Gaynor in 1974.
The first number one on Billboards National Disco Action Top 30 was "You Should Be Dancing" by the Bee Gees in 1976.
Until February 2020, Madonna has the record for most number-one songs in any Billboard chart with her record-extending 50 number-ones toping the Billboard Dance Club Songs Chart.
From the dance chart's inception until the week of February 16, 1991, several (or even all) songs on an EP, album or 12-inch single could occupy the same position if more than one track from a release was receiving significant play in clubs (for example, Donna Summer charted several full-length albums, both Chaka Khan and Madonna have hit number one with remix albums).  Chart entries like this were especially prevalent during the disco era, where an entire side of an album would contain several songs segued together seamlessly to replicate a night of dancing in a club.  Beginning with the February 23, 1991 issue, the dance chart became "song specific," meaning only one song could occupy each position at a time.
Because of the former policy allowing multiple songs to occupy one position at the same time, there have been three instances when not only multiple songs were at number one, but the songs were performed by different artists.  In all scenarios this was due to the tracks being included in film soundtrack albums.  In 1978, four tracks from Thank God It's Friday (Donna Summer, Pattie Brooks, Love & Kisses, Sunshine); in 1980, three tracks from Fame (two by Irene Cara and one by Linda Clifford); and in 1985, two songs from Beverly Hills Cop (Patti LaBelle, Harold Faltermeyer) hit number one together.
Madonna additionally became the first act to have scored at least one No. 1 on the Dance Club Songs chart in five separate decades since the chart's inception in 1976, having tallied 9 in the 1980s, 13 in the '90s, 18 in the 2000s, 9 in the '10s and, now, one (so far) in the '20s.
The Trammps are the only act to replace themselves at number one (issue date June 5, 1976, "That's Where the Happy People Go" → "Disco Party").
The longest running number-ones on the Hot Dance Club Songs chart are "Bad Luck" by Harold Melvin & the Blue Notes in 1975 and the album Thriller by Michael Jackson.  Both entries spent eleven weeks in the top spot.
"One Word" by Kelly Osbourne made chart history on June 18, 2005 when it became the first song to simultaneously top the Hot Dance Club Songs, Hot Dance Singles Sales and Hot Dance Airplay charts.
Madonna is also the first act ever to score as many as 50 No. 1s on any single Billboard chart, extending her record over George Strait, who has earned 44 leaders on Hot Country Songs.
LeAnn Rimes became the first country music artist to have topped both the Billboard country chart and the Hot Dance Club Songs chart. Rimes, who had several remixes of her country hits reach the dance chart, achieved that distinction during the week of February 28, 2009, when the electronic dance music remixes of her 2008 single "What I Cannot Change" reached number one.
Olivia Newton-John and Chloe Lattanzi's collaboration with Dave Audé, "You Have to Believe", which reached number one in its November 21, 2015 issue, made history for Newton-John and Lattanzi, as they became the first mother-daughter duo to reach number one on this chart as well as picking up their first number ones at Dance Club Songs as well, although Newton-John had charted four times prior to this.
Sting has the distinction of being the only artist to reach number one twice on this chart with a song he recorded and re-recorded, as his original version of "Stolen Car (Take Me Dancing)" featuring Twista reached that position in 2004, and again in 2016 as a featured duet with Mylène Farmer for "Stolen Car". In both cases, they were also remixed by Dave Audé, which is another first on this chart that a remixer reached number one with a song he remixed twice.

Footnotes

See also
List of Billboard number-one dance club songs
List of artists who reached number one on the U.S. Dance Club Songs chart
Artists with the most number-ones on the U.S. Dance Club Songs chart
Dance Singles Sales

Reference notes

References

External links
Current Billboard Dance Club Songs chart

1976 in music
1976 introductions
1976 establishments in the United States
2020 disestablishments in the United States
Billboard charts
Dance-pop